Stadio Claudio Tomei is a stadium in Sora, Italy.  It is primarily used for football, and was the home to the A.S.D. G.C. Sora. It opened in 1928 and holds 3,950 spectators.

References

Football venues in Italy
Sora, Lazio